Danegrove Primary School, formerly Littlegrove Mixed School and Oakland School, is a primary school in East Barnet in north London. It is on two sites, Ridgeway Avenue and Windsor Drive. The school buildings at Ridgeway Avenue, which joins Daneland, are grade II listed with Historic England.

History

Ridgeway Avenue
The school at Ridgeway Avenue was constructed in 1949-50 to a design by the Architects' Co-Partnership using a steel frame and precast concrete panels and coloured panel infill. It used a Hills 8' 3" system as specified by Hertfordshire County Council. The assembly hall includes an important mural by Fred Millett, now covered, who also designed for London Transport.

Windsor Drive
The Windsor Drive school, originally known as Littlegrove Mixed School, was opened in August 1933.

See also
 Little Grove

References

Further reading
 Saint, A. Towards A Social Architecture.

External links 
https://www.danegroveschool.co.uk/
http://www.piled-foundations.co.uk/danegrove-school-site/ 
https://b2faf562-995c-4cd8-a511-93e1dfc9ebce.filesusr.com/ugd/6ad571_c590b65d65fe44e796078a0953dad47f.pdf

East Barnet
Primary schools in the London Borough of Barnet
Grade II listed buildings in the London Borough of Barnet
Grade II listed educational buildings
Community schools in the London Borough of Barnet